Loading Medley is a typical Strongman event featured in World’s Strongest Man and other similar competitions which requires competitors to carry/ drag and load a combination several heavy and irregular objects onto a platform over a course usually ranging from 10 to 30 meters. The competitor to carry/ drag and load all objects in the fastest time is declared the winner.

Implements
Some of the frequently used objects for these events are anchors and chains, anvils, sandbags, sacks, safes, beer kegs, wine barrels and natural stones.

Physical demands
Contrary to popular belief, the weight of the objects is not the defining factor in these events. The overall shape of the objects, their dimensions, and the terrain (which can range from rubble to sand to snow) makes these events challenging and requires physical strength, athleticism and speed equally and also different skills are required for different objects since they are shaped very irregular.

Notable Strongmen
Below table summarizes the most successful Loading Medley winners in international Strongman competitions.
No. of total career Loading Medley's against the No. of wins (Entry criteria: A minimum of 3 wins and a >10% winning ratio).
With 2 wins per every 3 Loading Medley's he undertook, Iceland's Hafþór Júlíus Björnsson is the Greatest Loading Medley champion in Strongman history.

References

Strongmen competitions